Let the Tribe Increase is the only studio album by English anarcho-punk band The Mob. It was released in 1983, through record label All the Madmen, and is considered an early example of the anarchopunk genre.

History 

Let the Tribe Increase was the groups first (and only) LP.  It was preceded by three singles: Crying Again, Witch Hunt, and No Doves Fly Here, all songs which were included on Let the Tribe Increase.  The album was originally released in 1983 on All the Madmen Records.  The address used on the front cover was of the Freedom Press bookshop in London, as all band members were living in squats and co-ops at the time, and did not have a permanent address

Track listing 
All tracks composed by The Mob
 Side A

 "Another Day Another Death"
 "Cry of the Morning"
 "Dance On (You Fool)"
 "Raised in a Prison"
 "Slayed"
 "Our Life Our World"

 Side B

 "Gates of Hell"
 "I Wish"
 "Never Understood"
 "Roger"
 "Witch Hunt"

Personnel
Mark Wilson - "warbled" vocals, "strummed" guitar
Curtis Youe - "plucked" bass
Josef Porter - drums
Josef Porter, Mark Wilson, Stephen "Wilf" Wilmott - "Artbitz" (artwork)

References

External links 

 

1983 debut albums
The Mob (British band) albums